Ashover Butts railway station was a railway station serving the village of Ashover in Derbyshire, England. It was the terminus of the  narrow gauge Ashover Light Railway.

History

After an order under the Light Railways Act that had been obtained in 1918 to build a standard gauge railway between the Midland Railway station at Stretton and Ashover, was not proceeded with because the cost was too high, in 1920 Colonel H. F. Stephens proposed building the railway to  gauge. Construction started in 1922 and the railway opened to goods traffic in 1924.  The formal opening to passenger traffic took place in March 1925. Although the line was successful at first, road competition traffic decline and all passenger services were withdrawn in 1936.

The mineral traffic continued until the quarry closed with the railway closed in 1950.

Description

Ashover Butts had a single platform with a wooden building, which comprised an open-fronted shelter with an office on either side, one of which was for ticket sales. The other office briefly sold confectionery, but  then stood unused for many years. Latterly, it was  used to store moulds from the Butts concrete plant. In the last couple of years before passenger services ended, the building was painted grey.

References 

 
 

Disused railway stations in Derbyshire
Former Ashover Light Railway stations
Railway stations in Great Britain opened in 1925
Railway stations in Great Britain closed in 1936